Siddhaanth Vir Surryavanshi (15 December 1975 – 11 November 2022), also known as Anand Suryavanshi, was an Indian television actor. He appeared in over 25 Hindi television shows during his 21-year career and was known for his roles in Mamta and Kasautii Zindagii Kay.

Career
Surryavanshi made his television debut with Ekta Kapoor's series Kkusum in 2001. He appeared in two episodes of Krishna Arjun. In 2002–03, he played the recurring role of Vineet Khanna in Kasautii Zindagii Kay, which was one of his most popular roles. In 2004–05, he appeared in Zameen Se Aassman Tak, Sinndoor Tere Naam Ka and Saat Phere: Saloni Ka Safar. He played the lead role of Akshay Srivastav in Zee TV series Mamta in 2006–07. In 2008, he played the lead role of Rishi in family drama Grihasti on Star Plus. 

During 2009–11, he appeared in various TV shows, such as Virrudh, Bhagyavidhaata and Kya Dill Mein Hai. In 2012, he appeared as Dr. Dev in the Life OK crime detective supernatural series SuperCops vs Supervillains, also known as Hum Ne Li Hai... Shapath. He appeared in an episode of horror anthology series Fear Files: Darr Ki Sacchi Tasvirein along with Siddharth Vasudev. In 2015–16, he played the role of Karna's foster father Adiratha Sushen in the mythological epic series Suryaputra Karn. In 2016, he played for the Ahmedabad Express team as one of the contestants in the second season of the celebrity indoor cricket reality show Box Cricket League. He appeared as antagonist Harjeet Bajwa in the &TV social drama Waaris. He also appeared in the Star Plus series about Karna, Karn Sangini, which aired between October 2018 and February 2019. In 2019, he played the role of Mamoon Shah in the Star Bharat drama series Sufiyana Pyaar Mera.

In 2020–21, he played a lead role in the Zee TV drama series Kyun Rishton Mein Katti Batti as Kuldeep Chaddha, opposite Neha Marda. This was his first appearance in a major role after five years. He committed himself to playing the character of Kuldeep by gaining muscular definition, going on a special diet, and working out regularly for six months.

In 2022, he played the recurring role of Major Param Shergill in the Sony SAB youth-based drama series Ziddi Dil Maane Na. He appeared as DCP Shantanu Vyas in the Dangal TV crime thriller Control Room, which was his last TV appearance.

Personal life and death
Surryavanshi was born Anand Suryavanshi on 15 December 1975 in India. He married Ira in 2000 and the couple had a daughter. They divorced by mutual decision in 2015. He changed his name to Siddhaanth Vir Surryavanshi on the advice of a numerologist in 2016. He married Russian model Alesia Raut in November 2017. It was the second marriage for both of them; Alesia had a son from her previous marriage.

Surriyavanshi collapsed while working out in a gym in Mumbai on 11 November 2022. He was rushed to Kokilaben Dhirubhai Ambani Hospital, but was declared dead. Cardiac arrest was deemed to have been the cause of death. He is survived by his wife and two children. After similar recent deaths such as comedian Raju Srivastav and Kannada film actor Puneeth Rajkumar, concerns about sudden fatalities arising from over-exercising have been raised in India.

Television

Awards and Nominations

References

External links
 
 
 

1975 births
2022 deaths
21st-century Indian male actors
Indian male soap opera actors
Indian male television actors